Krishnathulasi (ml; കൃഷ്ണതുളസി) was an Indian television series which ran from 22 February 2016 to 13 April 2017 on Mazhavil Manorama channel. It starred, Mridula Vijay  as the main protagonist. The show took the time-slot at 9:30 PM and was later shifted to prime time 7:00 PM.

Plot 
The story is all about two sisters, Krishna and Tulasi who are bonded with lovely sisterhood. Tulasi, a blind teenage girl who loves her sister and claims that her sister is her eye, meanwhile Krishna, the elder, cares about her 2 members family since the death of their parents and support her younger sister in all the social and psychological issues she faces as only because she is blind. These two sisters lives in the seashore and creates a lovely siblings-triangle drama.

The story is written by the famous novel writer Joyce who also contributed two more television series to Mazhavil Manorama.

Cast 
 Mridula Vijay as Krishna/Muthumani [Main Female Lead]
 Anila Sreekumar as Vijayalakshmi [Female Lead] (died in serial)
 Subhash Nair as Karthikeyan [Main Male Lead]
 Muhammed Rafi as Ashokan [Male Lead]
 Anil Mohan as Maheendhran
 Adithyan Jayan as Jithendran
 Jayan as Vasavan [Antagonist]
 Valsala Menon as Madhavi Amma
 Umadevi Nair/Sabitha as Bhama
 Lekshmi Priya / Ambili Devi as Thara 
 Indulekha as Srikutty
 Sumi Santhosh as Jayasree
 Roslin
 Yathikumar as Achutha Kurup
 Akhina Shibu as Ramya
 Parvathy
 Vanchiyoor Praveenkumar as Shanmughan
 Ashraf Pezhumoodu as DYSP
 Dini Daniel as Chithralekha
 Thara Kalyan as Paappamma
 Ruby as Kasthoori
 Anumol
 Abhijit
 Manacaud Santosh as Gopikrishnan
 Adarsh as Rahul
 Akhil Anand
 Arya sreeram
 Yavanika Gopalakrishnan as Ramachandran
 Rageesh Raja Edupadikkal
 Anjusha as Thulasi [Krishna's blind sister] (died)
 Mahesh Lakshman as Gireesh (died)

References 

2016 Indian television series debuts
Malayalam-language television shows
Mazhavil Manorama original programming